The Blanc de Moming is a mountain of the Pennine Alps, located south of Zinal in the canton of Valais. It lies between the Besso and the Zinalrothorn. It is connected to the Zinalrothorn by a ridge named Arête du Blanc.

References

External links
Blanc de Moming on Hikr

Mountains of the Alps
Alpine three-thousanders
Mountains of Switzerland
Mountains of Valais